The Peppers was a French male instrumental group who had a hit single in 1974 with "Pepper Box". The song reached number 6 in the UK Singles Chart, and was a minor hit on the US Soul and Hot 100 charts.

Discography

Albums
A Taste Of Pepper, A Taste Of Honey / Pepper Box (1974) - AUS #25

Singles
"Pepper Box" / "A Pinch Of Salt" (1973-74) #6 (UK), #76 (US Hot 100), #34 (US Soul)
"Do It, Do It" / "Hot Caramel"/"Just a Rock"
"Hot Caramel" / "Blue Ballade"
"Doctor Music" / "Blue Ballad"

References

French musical groups